While Batman and Superman had their own animated series and comic book follow-ups, the rest of the characters in the  would appear in the following comics often.

The Batman Adventures

The Batman Adventures was created as a comic book tie-in to Batman: The Animated Series and The New Batman Adventures. Various titles related to the animated series ran from 1992 to 2004, along with various mini-series and one-shots.

Superman Adventures

Similar to The Batman Adventures, Superman Adventures was created as a comic book tie-in to Superman: The Animated Series. It ran between 1996 and 2002.

Gotham Girls

Adventures in the DC Universe

Adventures in the DC Universe is the title of a comic book published by DC Comics. Following on from The Batman Adventures and Superman Adventures, Adventures in the DC Universe used the same "animated style" as seen in the DC Animated Universe, but focused on a rotating cast of characters from throughout the DC Universe.

Most of the characters appearing in this series had yet to be seen in any DC Animated Universe series and, as such, their designs and histories were quite different from their appearances in the television series, such as Justice League. For example, Kyle Rayner often appears in this series, but he appears to be far less like his animated-series counterpart (who had not yet appeared on Superman: The Animated Series), and is more reflective, both visually and historically, of the character appearing in the regular DC Universe comics.

Justice League Adventures / Justice League Unlimited

Justice League Adventures is a DC comic book series featuring the Justice League, but set in the continuity (and style) of the television shows Justice League and Justice League Unlimited; as opposed to the regular DC Universe.

It is a sister title to The Batman Adventures (based on Batman: The Animated Series) and Superman Adventures (based on Superman: The Animated Series).

Justice League Adventures ran for 34 issues from 2002–2004 before being restarted under the title Justice League Unlimited (to match the recreation and renaming of the television series). The new title ran for 46 issues from 2004–2008 before being canceled in May 2008, ending the last production of the DC Animated Universe.

Justice League Infinity 
Justice League Infinity is a comic book continuation of the animated series Justice League Unlimited; the series will pick up where the original show ended and expand on loose ends that were left unsolved.
It debuted May 2021 in digital format and then physically released in July of the same year. The series is written by J. M. DeMatteis and James Tucker and illustrated by Ethan Beavers.

Batman Beyond and the Beyond universe

Batman Beyond also received a number of ongoing series and miniseries related to the TV series. Due to the popularity of the Batman Beyond concept, numerous tie-ins and cameos were created as a bridge between the DC Animated Universe and the DC Universe. Since 2012, DC Comics publishes three weekly digital series related to Batman Beyond and prints them monthly as Batman Beyond Unlimited.

Additional characters
While the Justice League and Justice League Unlimited comics did use many characters from the DC Universe, some characters never made it to the screen. Those that did not appear in the television series are listed below:

Heroes
 Adam Strange 
 Justice League Adventures #25-26
 Justice League Unlimited #4
 Was to appear in the Justice League Unlimited episode "Hunter's Moon" (originally titled "Mystery in Space", after the title of the comic Adam appeared in), but the character was off-limits to the creative team due to legal issues.
 Alan Scott (Green Lantern)
 Adventures in the DC Universe #4
 Justice League Adventures #20 (cameo)
 Justice League Unlimited #40
 He, along with the rest of the Justice Society of America, was to originally appear in the Justice League episode "Legends". The appearance was rejected because their portrayal was too similar to their Golden Age appearance, thus an analogue group (the Justice Guild of America) was created.
 Alec Holland
 Batman Adventures (vol. 2) #16 
 Animal Man
 Justice League Unlimited #29
 Atlanna
 Black Lightning
 Justice League Unlimited #15, 27
 Usage of the character (outside of the comic books) would have required paying royalties to Tony Isabella.
 Blue Beetle
 Adventures in the DC Universe #8
 Justice League Unlimited #5, 20, 43
 The rights to the character were unavailable due to the 1940s radio show of the same name.
 Connor Hawke (Green Arrow)
 Adventures in the DC Universe #13, 16
 Detective Chimp
 Justice League Unlimited #39
 Doctor Occult
 Justice League Unlimited #14
 Firestorm
 Justice League Unlimited #3, 8, 16
 Was to be the main character of the Justice League Unlimited episode "The Greatest Story Never Told".
 Freedom Fighters: Uncle Sam, Doll Man, the Human Bomb, the Phantom Lady, the Ray, and the Black Condor
 Justice League Unlimited #17
 Guy Gardner
 Adventures in the DC Universe #4 (cameo)
 Justice League Unlimited #32
 G'nort
 Justice League Unlimited #46
 Impulse
 Adventures in the DC Universe #13, Annual #1
 Jay Garrick (The Flash)
 Justice League Adventures #20 (cameo)
 Justice League Unlimited #12
 He, along with the rest of the Justice Society of America, was to originally appear in the Justice League episode "Legends". The appearance was rejected because their portrayal was too similar to their Golden Age appearance, thus an analogue group (the Justice Guild of America) was created. His costume does make an appearance in the Justice League Unlimited episode "Flash and Substance".
 Jim Corrigan
 Justice League Unlimited #37
 Julie Madison
 Batman Adventures (vol. 2) #1–2, 5 
 Kamandi
 Justice League Adventures #30
 Kon-El (Superboy)
 Adventures in the DC Universe #14, Annual #1
 Kent Shakespeare
 Justice League Adventures #28
 Phantom Stranger
 Batman: Gotham Adventures #33 
 Justice League Adventures #31
 Justice League Unlimited #14, 28
 Was going to appear in Adventures in the DC Universe #20, but the issue was never printed.
 Bruce Timm did want to use the Phantom Stranger and the Spectre, but could not receive permission, the reason for which was not stated.
 Eel O'Brian 
 Batman Adventures (vol. 2) #6 
 Power Girl (not to be confused with the character Galatea)
 Adventures in the DC Universe #6
 Justice League Unlimited #3, 13, 16
 Ragman
 Justice League Unlimited #15
 Space Cabby
 Justice League Unlimited #18
 Spectre
 Justice League Unlimited #37
 Thorn
 Adventures in the DC Universe Annual #1
 Ultra the Multi-Alien
 Adventures in the DC Universe #5
 XS 
 Adventures in the DC Universe #10
 Zauriel
 Justice League Unlimited #7, 14

Villains
 Anarky
 The Batman Adventures #31 
 Batman Adventures (vol. 2) #17 
 Anti-Monitor (cameo)
 Justice League Unlimited #32
 Black Manta
 Justice League Unlimited #26
 Was to appear in the Justice League episode "The Enemy Below", but was replaced by Deadshot, as the appearance was not faithful to the character.
 Was to appear in the Legion of Doom in Justice League Unlimited but, due to a restriction on the Aquaman characters, was replaced with Devil Ray.
 Black Mask
 Batman Adventures (vol. 2) #5–8 
 Black Spider
 Batman Adventures (vol. 2) #5–8 
 Brain Storm
 Justice League Unlimited #8
 Bronze Tiger
 Batman Adventures (vol. 2) #5–8 
 Cain and Abel
 The Batman Adventures #5
 Cavalier
 Batman Adventures (vol. 2) #1 
 Chuma
 Adventures in the DC Universe #3
 Chemo
 Justice League Adventures #13
 Cypher
 Adventures in the DC Universe #1, 2, 7, 8, 9
 DC Comics Presents: Wonder Woman Adventures #1
 Cryonic Man
 Justice League Adventures #12
 Demolition Team
 Justice League Unlimited #43
 Doctor Double X 
 Justice League Adventures #29
 Doctor Light
 Adventures in the DC Universe #1
 Justice League Adventures #6, 13
 DC Comics Presents: Wonder Woman Adventures #1
 Eobard Thawne
 Justice League Adventures #6 
 General Zod
 Justice League Unlimited #34
 He first appeared in Superman Adventures #21, but the story acted as a new introduction for Zod.
 Girder
 Justice League Unlimited #16
 Gorilla Boss
 Batman Adventures #5–8 
 Houngan
 Adventures in the DC Universe #4
 Kilg%re
Justice League Adventures #28.
 Lady Eve 
Justice League: The Animated Series Guide 
Justice League Adventures #23
 Madame Rouge
 Justice League Unlimited #31 
 Justice League Adventures #6
 Matter Master
 Justice League Unlimited #31
 Minister Blizzard
 Justice League Adventures #12
 Plasmus
 Red Hood
 Batman Adventures #8 
 Roland Desmond
Adventures in the DC Universe #1
DC Comics Presents: Wonder Woman Adventures #1 
 Shrapnel
 Adventures in the DC Universe #4
 Snowman
 Justice League Adventures #12
 Time Commander
 Justice League Unlimited #19

Marvel Family
The entire Marvel Family (except for Captain Marvel, who made a one-time appearance) were unable to appear on Justice League Unlimited due to legal reasons.

 Black Adam
 Adventures in the DC Universe #7
 Captain Marvel Jr.
 Adventures in the DC Universe #7
 Doctor Sivana
 Adventures in the DC Universe #7
 Justice League Unlimited #15
 Mary Marvel
 Adventures in the DC Universe #7
 Justice League Unlimited #20, 45
 Mister Atom
 Justice League Unlimited #15, 20

Collected editions

References

External links
 Justice League Adventures comic book guide at The World's Finest
 Justice League Unlimited comic book guide at The World's Finest
  Justice League Unlimited comic book guide at The Metrotower
 Jason Hall interview on Justice League Unlimited #33
 Adventures in the DC Universe at The World's Finest

Comics
Comics based on television series
DC Comics titles